The A1 motorway, locally referred to as the NicosiaLimassol highway  is the first and longest motorway built in Cyprus. It marked the beginning of an ambitious government project to link all the main cities on the island with modern 4 lane highways.  It is 73 km long and is free of any at-grade intersections.  It links the capital Nicosia (which is the administrative and financial hub), with Limassol, the largest port (and second largest city) on the island.

Junctions

1. Athalassas Avenue (Strovolos)-B1-A1
2.B22, (Kalamon, Strovolos)
3.C1, (Filippou Papakyprianou)(Strovolos)
4.C2, Latsia
5.E102(Road), Nisou
6.E103(Road)-A2, Pera Chorio
7.E104(Road), Mosfiloti
8.E143(Road), Kornos Dytika
9.A5-B1, Andreas
10.E143(Road), Skarinou
11.B1, Choirokoita
12.B1-E106(Road), Fornous
13.E107(Road), Fornous
14.B1, Faros(Cyprus)
15.F119(Road), Pentakomo
16.B1, Moni(Village, Cyprus)
17.F109(Road), Agios Tychon
18.Nikalas, Limasol

History 

In the late 1970s, the Cypriot Government introduced a series of schemes to improve the infrastructure of transport on the Island. The first planned motorway was to be built between Nicosia and Nicosia International Airport, roughly on the route of the current Griva Digeni Avenue. The road was widened in preparation but following the Turkish Invasion of Cyprus in July 1974 and the closure of the airport as a result, this scheme was abandoned, Construction started on the A1 to connect Nicosia with the new main port of Cyprus at Limassol in 1978.

The construction started at both ends concurrently. In the initial construction, the junctions were at grade separation. Although reconstruction at the Nicosia end has obliterated any evidence of this, drivers can still see the filter lanes at junction 17. The motorway was opened in stages, with the final stage (Kornos to Kophinou) completed in October 1984, while upgrades within the city of Limassol were completed in summer 2008. These upgrades included the Polemidia and Troödos junction, Agia Filaxis Junction, Agios Athanasios junction, Linopetra junction, and Germasogeia junction, and involved the replacement of a series of roundabouts with flyovers or underpasses.

Since 2012, the section of the motorway between the entrance of Nicosia and the intersection with the A2 motorway is upgraded to a 6 lane road due to heavy traffic observed.

See also 
 A2 motorway (Cyprus)
 A3 motorway (Cyprus)
 A4 motorway (Cyprus)
 A6 motorway (Cyprus)
 A7 motorway (Cyprus)
 A9 motorway (Cyprus)
 A22 motorway (Cyprus)

References 

Motorways and roads in Cyprus
Limited-access roads